Estádio Municipal Walter Ribeiro is a stadium in Sorocaba, Brazil. It has a capacity of 13,722 spectators. It is the home of Esporte Clube São Bento and Clube Atlético Sorocaba.

References

Football venues in São Paulo (state)
Sports venues in São Paulo (state)
Sorocaba
Esporte Clube São Bento